Difficult Run is a census designated place in Fairfax County, Virginia, United States. The population was 10,600 at the 2020 census.

References

Census-designated places in Fairfax County, Virginia
Census-designated places in Virginia